The 1986–87 Segunda División was the 38th season of the Mexican Segunda División. The season started on 18 July 1986 and concluded on 23 June 1987. It was won by UAT.

Changes 
 Cobras was promoted to Primera División. 
 No team was relegated from the Primera División due to the celebration of the Prode 85 and Mexico 86 tournaments held in a special way as part of the preparation of the national team for the 1986 FIFA World Cup, held in Mexico.
 Tapatío and Orizaba were promoted from Segunda División B.
 Progreso Cocula was promoted from Tercera División.
 Poza Rica, Córdoba and San Mateo Atenco were relegated to Segunda División B.
 Búfalos Curtidores sold its franchise to the Government of Zacatecas, a new team named Mineros de Zacatecas was created. This team was not related with the current team.
 Salamanca sold its franchise to Pioneros de Cancún.
 Atlacomulco returned to Texcoco.

During the season 
 After Week 6, Jaguares de Colima sold its franchise to the University of Colima, the team was renamed Loros UdeC.

Teams

Group stage

Group 1

Group 2

Group 3

Group 4

Results

Final stage

Group 1

Group 2

Final

Relegation Group

References 

1986–87 in Mexican football
Segunda División de México seasons